A public-safety answering point (PSAP), sometimes called public-safety access point, is a call center where emergency/non-emergency calls (like police, fire brigade, ambulance) initiated by any mobile or landline subscriber are terminated. It can also happen that when 112 is dialed in then a logic is implemented by mobile or network operators to route the call to the nearest police station. It is a call center in almost all the countries including Canada and the United States responsible for answering calls to an emergency telephone number for police, firefighting, and ambulance services.  Trained telephone operators are also usually responsible for dispatching these emergency services.  Most PSAPs are now capable of caller location for landline calls, and many can handle mobile phone locations as well (sometimes referred to as phase II location), where the mobile phone company has a handset to location system.  Some can also use voice broadcasting where outgoing voice mail can be sent to many phone numbers at once, in order to alert people to a local emergency such as a chemical spill.

In Canada and the United States, the county or a large city usually handles this responsibility.  As a division of a U.S. state, counties are generally bound to provide this and other emergency services even within the municipalities, unless the municipality chooses to opt out and have its own system, sometimes along with a neighboring jurisdiction.  If a city operates its own PSAP, but not its own particular emergency service (for example, city police but county fire), it may be necessary to relay the call to the PSAP that does handle that type of call.  The U.S. requires caller location capability on the part of all phone companies, including mobile ones, but there is no federal law requiring PSAPs to be able to receive such information.

There are 5,748 primary and secondary PSAPs in the U.S. as of February 2021  Personnel working for PSAPs can become voting members of the National Emergency Number Association (NENA).  Emergency dispatchers working in PSAPs can become certified with the National Academies of Emergency Dispatch (NAED), and a PSAP can become an IAED Accredited Center of Excellence.

Each PSAP has a 'real' telephone number that is called when the emergency number (911) is dialed.  The telecommunications operator is responsible for associating all landline numbers with the most applicable (often the nearest) PSAP, so that when emergency number is dialed, the call is automatically routed to the most suitable PSAP. PSAPs can be subject to changes including new contact information and changing coverage area. Commercial products exist that purport to keep pace with these changes and allow the telecommunications operator to associate numbers with the relevant PSAP based upon their physical address associated with that number.

In other countries, this is the responsibility of other types of local government, and the particular setup of the telephone network dictates how such calls are handled.

There is also now the ability to answer text messages at some PSAPs, which is useful in areas where weak signal strength due to distance from the nearest cell site causes fringe reception, resulting in blocked or dropped calls.  Since SMS messages only require an instant to send, a brief peak in radio propagation (such as a sudden favourable shift in multipath phase alignment) is often enough to get a message sent.  Text messages are also useful for the deaf or speech disabled, as it does not require a TTY device.

NENA i3 Solution 
The National Emergency Number Association (NENA) long-term solution for emergency calling, referred to as the i3 Solution, assumes end-to-end Internet Protocol (IP) signaling from the Voice over IP (VoIP) endpoint to an IP-enabled Public Safety Answering Point (PSAP), with callback and caller location information provided to the PSAP with the call. While the i3 Solution assumes end-to-end IP connectivity, and it is expected that an increasing number of PSAPs will evolve to support i3 functionality over time, legacy PSAPs must continue to be supported as originating networks and the Emergency Services infrastructure migrate toward IP.

Legacy PSAP Gateway 
The Legacy PSAP Gateway is a functional element of the i3 Solution architecture that supports the interconnection of the i3 ESInet with legacy PSAPs. The Legacy PSAP Gateway is expected to provide interworking and other functionality necessary for emergency calls routed via an i3 Emergency Services IP Network (ESInet) to be delivered to and handled by legacy PSAPs without requiring changes to legacy PSAP Customer Premises Equipment (CPE). Calls routed via an i3 ESInet and delivered to a legacy PSAP must undergo signaling interworking (i.e., at the Legacy PSAP Gateway) to convert the incoming IP-based (i.e., Session Initiation Protocol [SIP]) signaling supported by the ESInet to the traditional Multi-Frequency (MF) or Enhanced Multi-Frequency (E-MF) signaling supported by the legacy PSAP. Functionality must also be applied by the Legacy PSAP Gateway to emergency call originations to allow the legacy PSAP to experience call delivery, Automatic Location Identification (ALI) data retrieval, and feature activation the same way as they do today.

The Legacy PSAP Gateway must also support an ALI interface over which it can receive and respond to ALI queries from legacy PSAPs. Interfaces to a Location Information Server (LIS) and a Legacy Network Gateway must also be supported by the Legacy PSAP Gateway so that it can perform a de-referencing operation if the SIP signaling from the ESInet includes a location-by-reference. In addition, the Legacy PSAP Gateway must support an interface to an Emergency Call Routing Function (ECRF) in the i3 ESInet to support certain emergency call transfer scenarios. The Legacy PSAP Gateway may also support interfaces to Call Information Databases (CIDBs) to support access to additional non-location data associated with the emergency call, if a reference to such data is provided in incoming SIP signaling.

Telcordia GR-3166, Legacy Public Safety Answering Point (PSAP) Gateway Generic Requirements, addresses the external signaling interfaces that must be supported by the Legacy PSAP Gateway, including a SIP interface over which emergency calls will be delivered to it via the i3 ESInet, and traditional MF and/or E-MF interfaces to legacy PSAPs for call delivery.

See also 
 9-1-1
 112 (emergency telephone number)
 Enhanced 911
 North American Numbering Plan
 Next Generation 9-1-1
 Public safety department

References

External links 
 The Development of 9-1-1 and Wireless 9-1-1 Overview, from NENA's website
 Enhanced 911 PSAP Registry from the Federal Communications Commission website
 NAED website

Telephone services
Emergency communication
Emergency medicine